was the mayor of Shizuoka City in Japan until April, 2011, when he was succeeded by Nobuhiro Tanabe.  A graduate of the University of Tokyo, he was first elected mayor in 1998 after serving in the assembly of Shizuoka Prefecture for three terms.  He served as the first mayor of Shizuoka City after Shizuoka's merger with Shimizu in 2003.

In 1971, after college, he went to work at the Dai-Ichi Kangyo Bank (now Mizuho Bank) where he stayed until 1979. In 1979 he was elected to the Shizuoka Prefectural Assembly.

References
 

  

  
  
  

  
  
  

1947 births
Living people
People from Gifu Prefecture
University of Tokyo alumni
Mayors of places in Shizuoka Prefecture
Shizuoka (city)